Manu Vunipola may refer to:

 Manu Vunipola (rugby union, born 1967), Tongan rugby player and Minister for Sport
 Manu Vunipola (rugby union, born 2000), English rugby player